The Chicago World Language Academy was opened in 1894 to serve children from the crowded tenement community surrounding the Polk Street Station port of entry for immigrants. That year was started one of the first public schools kindergartens in Chicago, Illinois. 
Since 1981 this school has offered foreign language instruction to Chicago's students. In 1988, the Chicago World Language Academy moved into a new and up-to-date facility.

History

The school opened in 1894 at what is now 820 South Carpenter Street. In 1989 the school moved to a new building at 1340 West Harrison Street. That location, a century prior, had been the first West Side Park, home of the baseball club now known as the Chicago Cubs.

The Andrew Jackson Language Academy was renamed to The Chicago World Language Academy in May 2020 due to concerns of being associated with Andrew Jackson, who participated in the slave trade and owned over 300 slaves in his lifetime.

Languages

The Chicago World Language Academy has five different languages to offer. They are Japanese, French, Italian, Spanish, and Chinese.

Grades

The Chicago World Language Academy offers kindergarten through eighth grade. Each grade has two classes and two teachers. An exception is 7th and 8th graders. They have a teacher for each subject. Classes normally have around 32 children each.

References

Educational institutions established in 1894
1894 establishments in Illinois